Puma Ranra (Quechua puma cougar, puma, ranra stony, stony place) is a mountain in the Andes of Peru, about  high. It is situated in the Arequipa Region, Castilla Province, Andagua District, and in the Condesuyos Province, Salamanca District. Puma Ranra lies southwest of Usqullu and Wakapallqa and Usqullu Lake, and northeast of the Coropuna volcano.

References 

Mountains of Peru
Mountains of Arequipa Region